The  is an electric multiple unit (EMU) train type operated since 1988 by Tokyo Metro on the Tokyo Metro Marunouchi Line subway in Tokyo, Japan. Its design is based on the Tokyo Metro 01 series.

Operations
A total of 336 cars were introduced into service from 17 October 1988 in 8 batches. 53 six-car trainsets (batches 1 to 7) operate on the main section of the Marunouchi Line, while the Hōnanchō branch uses six three-car 20-80 series trainsets (batch 8).

Formations

6-car sets
The 53 six-car sets (01-53) are formed as shown below, with car 6 at the Ikebukuro end.

3-car sets

The 6 three-car Hōnanchō branch line sets (81-86) are formed as shown below, with car 3 at the Nakano-Sakaue end.

Interior

All refurbished trains have a pink interior and some LCD passenger information screens above all doors.

History
The first trains entered service from 17 October 1988.

In March 1998, Automatic Train Control was introduced on the 02 series, which was supplemented with a Train Automatic Stopping Controller (TASC) system allowing them to stop automatically at stations since November 2002.

Refurbishment

The 02 series fleet is undergoing major refurbishment, with the first treated trains returning to service from February 2010. Refurbishment includes the use of new Toshiba PMSM (permanent magnet synchronous motors), as fitted to the new Chiyoda Line 16000 series trains, offering energy savings of approximately 10%. Internally, pairs of 17-inch LCD passenger information monitors are installed above the passenger doors. The interior is finished in a pale salmon pink colour reminiscent of the original 300 series trains used on the line, and externally, a white "sine wave" design has been added to the red bodyside stripes, again reminiscent of the 300 series livery.

Replacement
A fleet of 53 new six-car trains is scheduled to be introduced from fiscal 2018, replacing the 02 series trains by fiscal 2022.
The new trains are classified as Tokyo Metro 2000 series.

References

 Shaw, Dennis and Morioka, Hisashi, "Tokyo Subways", published 1992 by Hoikusha Publishing
 02 series on Marunouchi Line (Main), Tokyo Metro, retrieved 22 May 2007

External links

 Tokyo Metro Marunouchi Line 02 series information 
 Tokyo Metro Marunouchi Branch Line 02 series information 

Electric multiple units of Japan
02 series
Train-related introductions in 1988
600 V DC multiple units
Kawasaki multiple units
Nippon Sharyo multiple units
Kinki Sharyo multiple units
Tokyu Car multiple units